Diana Kempa (born Diana Kavtorina) is a Kazakhstani female volleyball player. 
She is a member of the Kazakhstan women's national volleyball team.
She was part of the Kazakhstani national team  at the  2015 FIVB World Grand Prix, 2017 FIVB Volleyball World Grand Prix, and 2017 Asian Women's Volleyball Championship.

Clubs 

  Pavlodar (2015-present)

References

External links 

 FIVB profile
 CEV - Confédération Européenne de Volleyball

1992 births
Living people
Kazakhstani women's volleyball players
Volleyball players at the 2014 Asian Games
People from Temirtau
Asian Games competitors for Kazakhstan
21st-century Kazakhstani women